This battle in the Northern Seven Years' War took place on 7 July 1565 and was a decisive victory for a Swedish fleet of 49 ships, under Klas Horn, over a combined Danish and Lübecker fleet of 36 ships, under Otte Rud.

Battle
The Danish Dans Christopher was sunk and Trolle drowned but some of her survivors boarded and captured the small Swedish ship St Goran. The Swedish Grip was rammed and sunk by a larger Lübeck ship, which also sank as a result. After this the Allies returned to Copenhagen, and the Swedes to Dalarö. Swedish vice-admiral Sten Sture and his captain, Baner, were killed.

Ships involved

Sweden 

 St Erik 90 (flag)
 Finska Svan 82 (Vice Admiral Sten Sture, captain Baner)
 David 42
 Troilus 44
 Svenska Hektor 87
 Grip — rammed and sunk
 Böse Lejon 56 (ex-Danish Byens Løffue)
 St Goran — captured
 Gyllende Lejon / Forgylden Lejon — burnt
 40 (or possibly 53?) other ships

Denmark/Lübeck 

 Jegermesther 90 (flag) — captured
 Svenske Jomfru (Erik Rud)
 Dans Christopher (Nils Trolle) — sank
 Josua (Lübeck flag)
 Unknown ship (Lübeck) — sank after ramming
 19 other Danish ships
 12 other Lübeck ships

References 

 Kloth, Herbert: "Lübecks Seekriegswesen in der Zeit des nordischen 7-jährigen Krieges 1563–1570", Zeitschrift des Vereines für lübeckische Geschichte und Altertumskunde, Vol. 21 (1923), pp. 1–51, 185–256 plus Vol. 22 (1923–25), pp. 121–52 & 325–79
 Anderson, R. C.: Naval Wars in the Baltic 1522–1850
Lars Ericson Wolke, Martin Hårdstedt, Medströms Bokförlag (2009). Svenska sjöslag

1565
History of Lübeck
Conflicts in 1565